The XI Gay Games 2023, also known as Gay Games 11, GGHK2023, GGGDL2023 and Hong Kong - Guadalajara Gay Games 2023, is an upcoming international multi-sport event and cultural gathering organised by, but not limited to lesbian, gay, bisexual, and transgender (LGBTQ+) athletes, artists and musicians, known as Gay Games.

Originally planned to take place from 11 to 19 November 2022, it was eventually rescheduled  as a result of the COVID-19 pandemic in Hong Kong.

Bidding process 
In 2014 Dennis Philipse (a Dutch national, living in Hong Kong for long time) founded the community group OUT in HK to build an active community in Hong Kong. He remembered the Gay Games from 1998 in Amsterdam, and dreamt about bringing the Gay Games for the first time in its 40-year history to Asia. Link to TED talk by Dennis Philipse here
In 2014 he reached out to the Federation of Gay Games, to join the bidding process, and built the GGHK volunteer organisation from scratch. The bidding process included submitting a 300-page bid book proposal. And after being short-listed against Washington D.C. and Guadalajara (Mexico) in March 2017, all short-listed cities organised a 4-day site visit inspection for the inspectors in May 2017. In October 2017 each short-listed city had to do their final presentations in Paris, followed by the voting and winner announcement.

Hong Kong was announced as the host city of the 11th Gay Games, at a gala event at the Hotel de Ville in Paris, on October 30, 2017. They won with a clear majority of votes, in the first round of voting by the delegates of the Federation of Gay Games. It is the first time that the Gay Games will be held in Asia.

The "longlist" of cities interested in bidding to host Gay Games XI in 2022 was announced in April 2016. An unprecedented seventeen cities were interested in bidding. On 30 June 2016, the Federation of Gay Games announced that eleven cities had submitted their Letter Of Intent to formally bid. Anaheim, Atlanta, Des Moines, Madison, Minneapolis and San Antonio decided not to pursue their option to bid. On July 31, 2016, nine cities submitted their second registration fee to remain in the bid process. Both Cape Town and Tel Aviv dropped out at this stage, stating an intention to bid for Gay Games XII in 2026. On November 30, 2016, Bid Books were submitted by eight candidate cities with Los Angeles dropping out at this stage.

A shortlist of three Candidate Cities was announced on March 1, 2017. Guadalajara, Hong Kong and Washington, DC, hosted site visits before the final decision on the host city was made in Paris on Monday 30 October.

On 14 February 2022, Guadalajara was added as the co-host of this games.

Postponement and co-hosting 
In September 2021, the organisers announced that the 2022 Gay Games would be postponed one year, to November 2023, due to the ongoing COVID-19 pandemic and Hong Kong's strict travel quarantine protocols.

Due to the uncertain situation in Hong Kong, in February 2021, after 7 years (of which the last 2 years full-time) in volunteer capacity, Dennis Philipse stepped down from his role as leader to focus on his professional life. The decision was also made to co-host the Gay Games 11 event between Hong Kong and Guadalajara (Mexico), as Guadalajara was the 2nd winner running up.

Opening ceremony 
The opening ceremony was originally scheduled for 11 November 2022.

Events and venues 
The games will feature 22 sport together with arts & culture events throughout Hong Kong. The venues are yet to be confirmed.

Controversies

National Security Law enforcement
In 2021, the Taiwanese delegation announced that they will not send their athletes to the 2022 Gay Games for fear that members of the team could be arrested under the Hong Kong national security law, enacted in 2020.

See also 

 Federation of Gay Games, the sanctioning body of the Gay Games
 Gay Games
 Principle 6 campaign

References

External links
 Federation of Gay Games

2023 in multi-sport events
2023 in Hong Kong
2023 in Mexico
LGBT events in the People's Republic of China
LGBT in Mexico
Multi-sport events in Hong Kong
Multi-sport events in Mexico
LGBT in Hong Kong
Scheduled multi-sport events
Sports events postponed due to the COVID-19 pandemic